The 2019–20 Mohun Bagan A.C. season was the club's 24th season in the top flight Indian football and 130th season since the club's formation in 1889. The club also took part in Durand Cup,  CFL and SK Kamal International Cup.

Players
{|class="wikitable" style="text-align:center; font-size:90%; width:80%;"
|-
!style="background:#7A1024; color:white; text-align:center;"|Squad No.
!style="background:#1A5026; color:white; text-align:center;"|Name
!style="background:#7A1024; color:white; text-align:center;"|Nationality
!style="background:#1A5026; color:white; text-align:center;"|Position
!style="background:#7A1024; color: white; text-align: center;"| & Age
|-
!colspan=6 style="background:#7a1024; color:white; text-align:center;"|Goalkeepers
|-
|1
|Sankar Roy
|
|GK
|
|-
|-
|22
|Shilton Paul
|
|GK
|
|-
|24
|Debjit Majumder(on loan from ATK)
|
|GK
|
|-
!colspan=6 style="background:#1A5026; color:white; text-align:center;"|Defenders
|-
|4
|Francisco Morante Martínez
|
|DF
|
|-
|5
|Gurjinder Kumar (VC)
|
|DF
|
|-
|6
|Ashutosh Mehta
|
|DF
|
|-
|15
|Lalramchullova
|
|DF
|
|-
|25
|Dhanachandra Singh (C)
|
|DF
|
|-
|28
|Bikramjeet Singh(on loan from Mumbai City FC)
|
|DF
|
|-
|45
|Daneil Cyrus
|
|DF
|
|-
!colspan=6 style="background:#7a1024; color:white; text-align:center;"|Midfielders
|-
|10
|Joseba Agirregomezkorta Beitia
|
|MF
|
|-
|11
|Alexander Romario Jesuraj(on loan from FC Goa)
|
|MF
|
|-
|16
|Nongdamba Naorem(on loan from Kerala Blasters)
|
|MF
|
|-
|18
|Lalramzauva Khiangte
|
|MF
|
|-
|26
|Shilton D'Silva
|
|MF
|
|-
|27
|SK Sahil Y
|
|MF
|
|-
|33
|Britto PM 
|
|MF
|
|-
|44
|Kiyan Nassiri GiriY
|
|MF
|
|-
|47
|Sheikh Faiaz(on loan from ATK)
|
|MF
|
|-
|50
|Francisco Javier González Muñoz
|
|MF
|
|-
!colspan=6 style="background:#1A5026; color:white; text-align:center;"|Forwards
|-
|7
|Komron Tursunov
|
|FW
|
|-
|9
|Baba Diawara
|
|FW
|
|-
|20
|Suhair VP
|
|FW
|
|-
|49
|Subha Ghosh Y
|
|FW
|
|-

Y Players promoted from the youth team.

Transfers
In

Out

Kits

Staff
{| class="wikitable"
|-
!style="background:#1a5026; color:white; text-align:center"|Position
!style="background:#7a1024; color:white; text-align:center"|Name
|-
| Chief Coach 
| Kibu Vicuña
|-
| Assistant Coach 
| Tomasz Tchórz
|-
| Assistant Coach 
| Ranjan Chowdhury 
|-
|-
| Goalkeeping Coach
| Dipankar Chowdhury 
|-
| Physical Trainer/Sports Therapist 
| Paulius Ragauskas
|-
| Team Manager
| Satyajit Chatterjee

Competitions

Overview

I-League

League table

Results summary

Matches

Durand Cup

Group stage

Matches

Knockout stages
Semi-final

Final

Calcutta Football League

Results by round

Matches

Sheikh Kamal Cup

Group stage

Matches

Knockout stages
Semi-final

Statistics

Overall player statistics 

Y Youth team player

Goalscorers 

Y Youth team player.

References

Mohun Bagan AC seasons
Mohun Bagan